Always for Pleasure is a 1978 documentary film by Les Blank about social traditions in New Orleans, Louisiana.

The film has footage of musical events, Mardi Gras Indians, a "jazz funeral" with traditional music, various second-line parades and cooking and eating of red beans and rice and a crawfish boil. Events filmed include New Orleans Mardi Gras and St. Patrick's Day 1977. Local musicians perform and are interviewed, including Kid Thomas Valentine, Allen Toussaint, Danny Barker, Blue Lu Barker, Irma Thomas, the Neville Brothers and Professor Longhair. The film profiles predominantly white second-line organizations whereas many other documentaries have falsely portrayed these traditions as the domain of mostly black groups.

The film subtitles a Creole song as "Hey Legba" although its title phrase is actually "Eh là-bas", a formerly common Louisiana Creole greeting roughly translated as "Hey you over there." However, in New Orleans, Legba was often referred to as "Papa La Bas", and some scholars such as Henry Louis Gates, believe that "Eh La Bas" is a covert reference to Legba.

Always for Pleasure was preserved by the Academy Film Archive in 1999.

The DVD rerelease includes additional performance footage of Professor Longhair.

References

External links
 
 Always For Pleasure on LesBlank.com

1978 documentary films
1978 films
American documentary films
1970s English-language films
Films directed by Les Blank
Documentary films about New Orleans
Documentary films about music and musicians
Films about food and drink
1970s American films